Vagonu Parks Station is a railway station in Riga Municipality on the Riga-Aizkraukle regional line, and the Riga–Daugavpils Railway Line.

References 

Railway stations in Riga